The "Lt. Col. J. I. Turnbull Award" — also known as the Jack Turnbull Award — is an award given to the United States' top collegiate attackman in lacrosse, named after National Lacrosse Hall of Fame alumnus Jack Turnbull. The award is given to a player in Division I, Division II, and Division III.

Award winners

By University

See also
F. Morris Touchstone Award
Lt. Raymond Enners Award
McLaughlin Award
Schmeisser Award

References

External links
US Lacrosse Awards page

College lacrosse trophies and awards in the United States